Vladimir Valeryevich Bure (born 4 December 1950) is a Russian former freestyle swimmer and a fitness coach for the New Jersey Devils of the NHL. Bure is the father of retired NHL players Pavel and Valeri Bure.

USSR
Bure competed for the Soviet Union at the 1968, 1972 and 1976 Olympics and won four medals: one in the individual 100 m and three in the relay. Additionally, Bure was a two-time European champion as well as a 17-time Soviet champion. He also won two silver medals at the 1973 and 1975 World Championships.

Bure was swimming coach at the Armed Forces Society in 1979–85. After that he served as Vice President of Exsport club (1985–91), where he managed eight different sports.

Vladimir, whose family originated from Furna, Switzerland, had a noble history: his ancestors made precious watches for Russian tsars from 1815 to 1917 and as craftsmen of the imperial family, were granted noble status.[4]
Vladimir married Tatiana Bure and they had two sons born in Moscow - Pavel born on March 31, 1971 and Valeri born on June 13, 1974.

North America
In 1991, Vladimir and his sons Pavel and Valeri moved to North America. They settled initially in Los Angeles where Vladimir continued to train and coach both Valeri and Pavel in hockey and physical conditioning until Pavel embarked on a National Hockey League (NHL) career with the Vancouver Canucks However both sons became estranged from their father, along with his second wife Julia, and their half-sister Katya, by 1998. Neither brother has explained a reason for the split.

Vladimir joined Pavel, spending four seasons (1994–98) as fitness consultant with Vancouver Canucks. In the summer of 1999 he joined the New Jersey Devils as fitness consultant. He won the Stanley Cup twice with New Jersey, in 2000 and 2003. His name was engraved on the Stanley Cup in 2003.

References

External links

Vladimir Bure's personal website

1950 births
Living people
Armed Forces sports society athletes
European Aquatics Championships medalists in swimming
New Jersey Devils coaches
Olympic bronze medalists for the Soviet Union
Olympic bronze medalists in swimming
Olympic silver medalists for the Soviet Union
Olympic swimmers of the Soviet Union
People from Norilsk
Recipients of the Order of Lenin
Russian people of Swiss descent
Russian male freestyle swimmers
Soviet male freestyle swimmers
Stanley Cup champions
Swimmers at the 1968 Summer Olympics
Swimmers at the 1972 Summer Olympics
Swimmers at the 1976 Summer Olympics
Vancouver Canucks coaches
World Aquatics Championships medalists in swimming
Soviet people of Swiss descent
Honoured Coaches of Russia
Medalists at the 1972 Summer Olympics
Medalists at the 1968 Summer Olympics
Olympic silver medalists in swimming
Universiade medalists in swimming
Vladimir
Universiade gold medalists for the Soviet Union
Universiade bronze medalists for the Soviet Union
Medalists at the 1970 Summer Universiade
Medalists at the 1973 Summer Universiade
Sportspeople from Krasnoyarsk Krai